Yathreb Adel, (born 6 March 1996 in Cairo) is an Egyptian professional squash player who represents Egypt. She reached a career high world ranking of World No.13 in July 2020.

References

External links 

Egyptian female squash players
Living people
1996 births
Sportspeople from Cairo
21st-century Egyptian women